Pennin Manathai Thottu is a 2000 Indian Tamil-language romantic drama film written and directed by Ezhil. The film stars Prabhu Deva and Jaya Seal, with Sarathkumar in a guest appearance. Produced by Kaja Mydeen, the film was released on 7 July 2000 to positive reviews and became a commercial success.

Plot
Sunil is one of the leading heart surgeons in India. He lives in Trichy with Ganpat, who is also a doctor and is loved by everyone in the family. Sunitha arrives with a kid who has a heart problem to the hospital. But she is shocked seeing Sunil there and lashes out when she learns he is the doctor who is about to treat the kid.

The movie goes for a flashback. Sunil's brother Balaram is a rich thug but does not want his brother to follow his footsteps, therefore always sends him to study.  Sunitha and Sunil are classmates in a medical college in Chennai and they both fall in love. Sunil expresses his wish of marrying Sunitha to Bala, for which he accepts. Meanwhile, Sunitha goes back to her village for her sister's child's ear piercing ceremony. Her sister's husband is money-minded and tries to get Sunitha married to a rich man in return for money. Sunitha is not interested in this alliance as she is in love with Sunil and calls him, asking him to come and rescue her, but he doesn't come. Sunitha's sister commits suicide to stop the marriage. Sunitha is angered on Sunil as he didn't come to save her, which also resulted in her sister's death. Sunitha takes her sister's child and leaves.

Sunil tries to meet Sunitha and convey the reason for not coming to save her, but Sunitha is not ready to listen. Sunil is worried and decides to leave to Canada, accepting a job offer there. Finally, Sunitha understands the truth: her sister's husband had killed Bala on the day of the marriage; therefore, Sunil wasn't able to come on time to stop the wedding. Sunitha finds out and tries to find and stop Sunil, who is going to Canada. In the end, she finds him and they reunite.

Cast

 Prabhu Deva as Sunil
 Jaya Seal as Sunitha (Voice dubbed by Jayageetha)
 Vivek as Kandhasamy
 Dhamu as Dhamu
 Vaiyapuri as Mute servant
 Aishwarya as Sunitha's sister
 Kaveri as Meena
 Moulee as Ganapathy
 S. Rajasekar as Doctor Shyam
 Kaka Radhakrishnan as Ganapathy's father
 N. Mathrubootham as Professor Das (Lord Labakkudaas)
 Ramji as Ramji
 Madhan Bob as Madhan
 Chaplin Balu as Thozhar Arivumathi
 Ponnambalam as Rowdy
 Pandu as Police inspector
 Mahanadi Shankar as Rowdy
 S. N. Lakshmi as Ganapathy's mother
 Shanthi Williams as Mythili
 Jayapriya
 Hemanth Ravan as Sunitha's brother-in-law
 Vasu Vikram as Pandi
 Sukran as Student
 Kottachi as Kottangachi
 MLA Thangaraj as MLA Ekambaram, Kandhasamy's father
 Crane Manohar as Pickpocket
 Bava Lakshmanan as Pickpocket
 Mayilsamy as Pickpocket
 Krishnamoorthy as Pickpocket
 Vijay Ganesh as Pickpocket
 Sakthivel as Sakthivel
 Sampath Ram as Henchman
 Sridhar as Dancer
 Kanal Kannan as Left
 Karu Pazhaniappan as Man giving change (uncredited role)
 Sarathkumar as Balaram (guest appearance)
 Raju Sundaram in a special appearance

Production
After the success of Thulladha Manamum Thullum (1999), Vijay and Ezhil immediately decided to follow up this film with another collaboration, Oru Pennin Manathai Thottu, with either Isha Koppikar or Roja as the lead actress. However soon after pre-production, Vijay was replaced by Prabhu Deva. Newcomer Jaya Seal was selected after the producers had spotted her in a commercial for Sunrise Coffee.

Sarathkumar chose to be a part of the film after two of his other films became suddenly postponed. He had cut his hair short for Maayi (2000), and as the other films required different hairstyles, the producers had pushed back the dates. To make most of the lost time, Sarathkumar agreed to portray an extended guest role in the film.

The shooting for the film was held at locations in Chennai, Hyderabad, and Bangalore. A song was shot on Prabhu Deva and his brother Raju Sundaram with a set resembling a market place was erected, and about 40 dancers participated in the dance with the duo.

Soundtrack
The soundtrack was composed by S. A. Rajkumar, with 6 tracks overall.

Release
A critic from Rediff.com wrote "the movie has its moments, so I wouldn't say this is a must-avoid" and praised the performances of Prabhu Deva and Sarathkumar. Balaji B wrote: "the intention of the director may have been to ratchet up the tension, it ends up feeling like an unnecessary extension of an already threadbare movie".

In popular culture
The song "Kalluri Vaanil" danced by Prabhu Deva became widely known on the internet in the form of a mondegreen spoof and viral video, following its subtitling as "Benny Lava" by YouTube user Mike Sutton (Buffalax) and "Rivaldo sai desse lago" (for Brazilian viewers). The name Benny Lava comes from Sutton's homophonic translation of the Tamil lead line "Kalluri vaanil kaayndha nilaavo?" as "My loony bun is fine, Benny Lava!" (original meaning: "The moon (metaphor for 'my love') that scorched the college campus"). This video led other YouTube users to refer to Prabhu Deva as "Benny Lava".

Reactions to the "Kalluri Vaanil" mondegreen were mixed. Some felt that the video was done in "good fun" while others worried that their culture was being mocked. The video was described by the Philippine Daily Inquirer as a "Catchy melody, a battalion of back-up dancers, colourful costumes, impressive vocal gymnastics, jaw-dropping choreography this music video has it all. And if those aren't enough, the person who uploaded this vid also provided subtitles so you can sing along. They aren't the real lyrics though, but just what they sound in English, resulting in a lot of nonsense." The music video was featured on The Colbert Report on 4 December 2008 and appeared on the Heavy Metal documentary Global Metal. As of at least 1 April 2011, the original video has been removed because of the disabling of Buffalax's YouTube account. However, several other users have uploaded copies of the original video on their YouTube accounts. In 2014, British-American hip-hop group Swet Shop Boys sampled the original song for their debut single, called "Benny Lava."

References

2000 films
2000s Tamil-language films
Indian romantic drama films
Films scored by S. A. Rajkumar
Films shot in Chennai
Films shot in Bangalore
Films shot in Hyderabad, India
Films directed by Ezhil
2000 romantic drama films